The 2012–13 Canisius Golden Griffins men's basketball team represented Canisius College during the 2012–13 NCAA Division I men's basketball season. The Golden Griffins, led by first year head coach Jim Baron, played their home games at the Koessler Athletic Center and were members of the Metro Atlantic Athletic Conference. They finished the season 20–14, 11–7 in MAAC play to finish in a tie for fourth place. They lost in the quarterfinals of the 2013 MAAC tournament to Iona. They were invited to the 2013 CIT where they defeated Elon and Youngstown State to advance to the quarterfinals where they lost to Evansville.

Roster

Schedule

|-
!colspan=12 style=| Exhibition

|-
!colspan=12 style=| Regular season

|-
!colspan=12 style=| MAAC tournament
|-

|-
!colspan=12 style=| 2013 CIT
|-

References

Canisius Golden Griffins men's basketball seasons
Canisius
Canisius